Streets Is Watching is a musical film in which Jay-Z composes a film with many of his unreleased music videos tied into a storyline. The film takes place in Jay-Z's old neighborhood in Brooklyn, New York. The film uses transitional skits between music from Jay-Z's albums Reasonable Doubt and In My Lifetime, Vol. 1. The film is noteworthy because it contains Jay-Z's first two videos, "In My Lifetime" and "I Can't Get Wit That", both released without a major label contract. Each skit is meant to accompany the music it precedes. The same setting or set of the videos are also the same set for the correlating skit.

Soundtrack
Streets Is Watching (soundtrack)

See also
Moonwalker, a film by Michael Jackson that also compiles music videos into a continuous film.

References

External links 
 

1998 films
1990s hip hop films
1990s musical films
American musical films
Films set in Brooklyn
Hood films
Jay-Z
Musical films based on actual events
PolyGram Filmed Entertainment films
Universal Pictures direct-to-video films
1998 direct-to-video films
1990s English-language films
1990s American films